Sukhaya is a rural locality (a selo) in Kabansky District, Republic of Buryatia, Russia. The population was 550 as of 2010. There are 32 streets.

Geography 
Sukhaya is located 95 km northeast of Kabansk (the district's administrative centre) by road. Zarechye is the nearest rural locality.

References 

Rural localities in Kabansky District
Populated places on Lake Baikal